Carex acutiformis, the lesser pond-sedge, is a species of sedge.

Description

Ecology
It is native to parts of northern and western Europe, where it grows in moist spots in a number of habitat types. In its native European range this species is often associated with the Juncus subnodulosus–Cirsium palustre fen-meadow habitat. It is also a dominant plant in the Carex acutiformis swamp plant association.

References

External links

acutiformis
Flora of Europe
Flora of Asia
Flora of North Africa
Plants described in 1789
Taxa named by Jakob Friedrich Ehrhart